Nellore railway station (station code:NLR) is a railway station of the city of Nellore in the Indian state of Andhra Pradesh. It is situated on Vijayawada–Gudur section and is administered under Vijayawada railway division of South Coast Railway zone (formerly South Central Railway zone).

History 
The Vijayawada–Chennai link was established in 1899. The Chirala–Elavur section was electrified in 1980–81.

Classification 
In terms of earnings and outward passengers handled, Nellore is categorized as a Non-Suburban Grade-3 (NSG-3) railway station. Based on the re–categorization of Indian Railway stations for the period of 2017–18 and 2022–23, an NSG–3 category station earns between – crore and handles  passengers. It has been selected for the Adarsh Station Scheme, a scheme for upgradation of stations by the Indian Railways.

Structure and amenities 
Nellore railway station is having escalators on 4 platforms. SCR recently installed Automatic Ticket Vending Machines (ATVM)s in Nellore station. It is amongst the top hundred booking stations of Indian Railway. Daily 140 trains, including 132 express trains and 6 passenger trains and 2 EMU/DMU are passing through this station. Nellore railway station was ranked as the 28th cleanest railway station in the country. The Railways ministry has announced that the Nellore Railway station will be modified with world class amenities and its look will be beautified under the ambitious project of "Redevelopment of Railway stations" with Rs 100 crores.

References

External links 

Transport in Nellore
Railway stations in Nellore district
Vijayawada railway division
Railway stations in India opened in 1899